Ariyan Annette Johnson (born April 30, 1976), credited as Ariyan Johnson, is an American actress, television director, dancer and choreographer. Johnson is best known for her role as Chantel Mitchell in the 1992 indie drama film Just Another Girl on the I.R.T. She also portrayed Aisha on The WB hit comedy television series The Steve Harvey Show, only appearing in its second season (1997–98).

Early life
Born in Brooklyn, New York's Bedford–Stuyvesant neighborhood to artistically inclined parents, Johnson grew up training in the arts. Her father, a painter and contemporary artist, and her mother, an actress and dancer, were both educators who owned a theatrical dance company. Johnson attended LaGuardia High School of Performing Arts where she majored in dance and film. She later attended Alvin Ailey American Dance Theater, Martha Graham Center of Contemporary Dance, and 92nd St. Y Harkness Dance Center.

Award nomination
Johnson was nominated for the Independent Spirit Award for Best Female Lead in 1994, for her role as Chantel Mitchell in the film Just Another Girl on the I.R.T.

Filmography

Film

Television

Video Games

References

External links

1976 births
Living people
21st-century American actresses
Actresses from New York City
People from Bedford–Stuyvesant, Brooklyn
Fiorello H. LaGuardia High School alumni
African-American actresses
American television actresses
American film actresses
21st-century African-American women
21st-century African-American people
20th-century African-American people
20th-century African-American women